In enzymology, a galactosylceramide sulfotransferase is an enzyme that catalyzes the chemical reaction

3'-phosphoadenylyl sulfate + a galactosylceramide  adenosine 3',5'-bisphosphate + a galactosylceramidesulfate

Thus, its two substrates are 3'-phosphoadenylyl sulfate and galactosylceramide, and its two products are adenosine 3',5'-bisphosphate and galactosylceramidesulfate.

It belongs to the family of transferases, specifically the sulfotransferases, which transfer sulfur-containing groups.  The systematic name of this enzyme class is 3'-phosphoadenylyl-sulfate:galactosylceramide 3'-sulfotransferase. Other names in common use include GSase, 3'-phosphoadenosine-5'-phosphosulfate-cerebroside sulfotransferase, galactocerebroside sulfotransferase, galactolipid sulfotransferase, glycolipid sulfotransferase, and glycosphingolipid sulfotransferase.  This enzyme participates in sphingolipid metabolism.

References

 
 

EC 2.8.2
Enzymes of unknown structure